Agnes Denes (Dénes Ágnes; born 1931 in Budapest) is a Hungarian-born American conceptual artist  based in New York. She is known for works in a wide range of media—from poetry and philosophical writings to extremely detailed drawings, sculptures, and iconic land art works, such as Wheatfield — A Confrontation (1982), a two-acre field of wheat in downtown Manhattan, commissioned by the Public Art Fund, and Tree Mountain—A Living Time Capsule (1992–96) in Ylojärvi, Finland. Her work Rice/Tree/Burial with Time Capsule (1968–79) is recognized as one of the earliest examples of ecological art. She lives and works in New York City.

Early life and career
Born in Budapest, Hungary in 1931, her family survived World War II, the Nazi occupation, and moved to Sweden on their way to the United States. Still a teenager, she created her first environmental/philosophical work, Bird Project, in Sweden, comparing migrating bird colonies to people — the migrants of the world. She studied painting at the New School and Columbia University in New York. 

She began her artistic career as a poet. Her poetic practice eventually became works of a unique intellectual content and form she later called Visual Philosophy.<ref name="Ottmann">Agnes Denes's Visual Philosophy, essay by Klaus Ottmann, Chief Curator of The Phillips Collection in Washington, DC, in Agnes Denes: Absolutes and Intermediates, edited by Emma Enderby, The Shed, 2019</ref> She has said that the repeated changes in language led her to focus on the visual arts. She soon abandoned painting, due to the constraints of the canvas, and focused broadly on ideas she could explore in other mediums, saying, "I found its vocabulary limiting."

In the early 1970s, she joined the A.I.R. Gallery as a founding member. She has since participated in more than 600 exhibitions at galleries and museums throughout the world, and has written six books. She has one son, Robert T. Frankel and twin grandchildren, Ian and Alessa Frankel. 

Her image is included in the iconic 1972 poster Some Living American Women Artists by Mary Beth Edelson.

Selected works

EcologicalRice/Tree/Burial 1968, Eco-Logic, Sullivan County, New York; re-created 1977 at Artpark
As a pioneer of Land Art, Agnes Denes created Rice/Tree/Burial in 1968 in Sullivan County, New York. Acknowledged as the first site-specific performance piece with ecological concerns, it was enacted ten years later on an expanded scale at Artpark in Lewiston, New York. This performance piece involved planting rice seeds in a field in upstate New York, chaining surrounding trees and burying a time capsule filled with copies of her haiku. "It was about communication with the earth," Denes said, "and communicating with the future.""

 Agnes Denes at Artpark, 1977-1979 
During her time at Artpark, Denes recreated her Rice/Tree/Burial piece from 1968.  In 1977, she planted a half acre (0.2 ha) of rice 150 feet (45 m) above the spot where Niagara Falls had originally formed. The land itself that she worked on was known to have been an industrial dumping ground, which affected the quality of the rice. In 1978, she continued the project by chaining together trees in the forest in the park to symbolize interference with growth. On August 20, 1979, Denes buried a time capsule at 47° 10′ longitude, 79° 2′ 32″ latitude set to be opened in the twenty-third century. The capsule includes microfilmed responses of university students to questions about the nature of humanity. Along with the rice, time capsule, and ceremonial chaining of trees in the park, Denes shot photographs of Niagara Falls for this iteration of Rice/Tree/Burial to "add natural force as the fourth element and fuse the other three".Wheatfield — A Confrontation 1982 Manhattan, Battery Park City landfill

After months of preparations, in May 1982, a two-acre (0.8 ha) wheat field was planted on a landfill in lower Manhattan, two blocks from Wall Street and the World Trade Center, facing the Statue of Liberty, sponsored by the Public Art Fund. To create the work, titled Wheatfield — A Confrontation, 200 truckloads of dirt were brought in and 285 furrows were dug by hand and cleared of rocks and garbage. The seeds were sown by hand and the furrows covered with soil. The field was maintained for four months, cleared of wheat smut, weeded, fertilized, and sprayed against mildew fungus, and an irrigation system was set up. The crop was harvested on August 16 and yielded over 1,000 pounds (455 kg) of healthy, golden wheat.Tree Mountain-a living time capsule 1996, Ylöjärvi, Finland
A monumental earthwork reclamation project and the first human-made virgin forest, situated in Ylöjärvi, Western Finland. The site was dedicated by the President of Finland upon its completion in 1996 and is legally protected for the next four hundred years.A Forest for Australia reforestation of Red Gum, She Oak, and Paperbark trees in Melbourne Australia 1998
6000 trees of an endangered species with varying heights at maturity were planted into five spirals by the artist, creating a step pyramid for each spiral when the trees are fullgrown. The trees help alleviate serious land erosion and desertification threatening Australia.

Nieuwe Hollandse Waterlinie Master Plan, 2000
A 25-year master plan to unite a 100 kilometer-long string of forts dating from the sixteenth to the nineteenth centuries. Incorporating water and flood management, urban planning, historical preservation, landscaping, and tourism into a single plan.North Waterfront Park Masterplan, Berkeley, California, 1988-91. Site plan and art concept.
A conceptual master plan was developed for the conversion of a 97-acre municipal landfill, surrounded by water on three sides in the San Francisco Bay, into an oasis for people and nature.The Living Pyramid, Socrates Sculpture Park, Long Island City, NY, 2015.
One in a series of large earth sculptures, The Living Pyramid, was the first land art work by the artist in New York City in over 3 decades. Commission by the Socrates Sculpture Park, it was on view from May through October 2015, and recreated in 2017 for documenta 14 in Kassel, Germany.The Living Pyramid, Sakıp Sabancı Museum, Istanbul, Turkey, 2022.

An Agnes Denes work titled Living Pyramid is continuing its presence on the grounds of Istanbul's Sakıp Sabancı private museum on Sabancı University.

The pyramid has different plants from the Istanbul flora placed on its sides depending on the need for shade or sun.

Visual philosophy
Beginning in 1968, she began an intensive exploration of philosophy through art. The result was, according to Jill Hartz of Cornell University, "an amazing body of work, distinguished by its intellectual rigor, aesthetic beauty, conceptual analysis, and environmental concern."
 Paradox and Essence (Philosophical Drawings), 1976, Published by Tau/ma Press, Rome, Italy, in English and Italian. Edition of 200; 60 pages
 Sculptures of the Mind, 1976, Published by the University of Akron Press, Akron, Ohio. Edition of 1,000, 250 signed and numbered; 50 pages
 Isometric Systems in Isotropic Space: Map Projections (from the Study of Distortions Series, 1973-1979), 1979. Published by Visual Studies Workshop Press, Rochester, New York. Edition of 200 hardback copies in silver foil, signed and numbered by the artist; edition of 600 in paperback; 100 pages, color and black and white throughout, 29 original drawings specially created for the book, 22 transparent pages.Original drawings for Isometric Systems, from the Museum of Modern Art Collection Early Philosophical Drawings, Monoprints, and Sculpture 1970-1973

Sculpture
 Sculptures of the Mind 1968-2012

Writing
See three titles under Visual Philosophy, above.
 Book of Dust: The Beginning and the End of Time and Thereafter, 1989 Visual Studies Workshop Press, Rochester, New York. Edition of 1,100 of which 200 are signed with an original artwork. Insert ("The Debate - 1 Million B.C. - 1 Million A.D.); 200 pages, 16 full-page duotones
 The Human Argument, 2008 Spring Publications, Putnam, Connecticut.
 Poetry Walk—Reflections: Pools of Thought, 2000 Charlottesville, Va.: University of Virginia Art Museum.

Catalogues
 Agnes Denes: Perspectives, Corcoran Gallery of Art, Washington, DC, 1974
 Agnes Denes: Sculptures of the Mind / Philosophical Drawings by Amerika Haus Berlin, 1978
 Agnes Denes 1968 -1980, Gary Garrels curator, Hayden Gallery, MIT, Boston, 1980
 Agnes Denes: Concept into Form, Works : 1970-1990, Arts Club of Chicago, 1990
 Agnes Denes by Jill Hartz, Herbert F. Johnson Museum of Art, Cornell University, 1992
 The Visionary Art of Agnes Denes: An Exhibition of 85 Works, Gibson Gallery, 1996
 Project for Public Spaces, a Retrospective, Samek Art Gallery, Bucknell University, Lewisburg PA; 2003Agnes Denes: Work 1969 - 2013, curated and edited by Florence Derieux, FRAC Champagne-Ardenne, Firstsite Colchester, Mousse Publishing, 2013-2016Agnes Denes: Absolutes and Intermediates'', edited by Emma Enderby, The Shed, 2019

Public collections
Denes has more than ten works in the Museum of Modern Art's collection. In the Metropolitan Museum, the artist has five pieces in the permanent collection. At the Whitney Museum of American Art, Denes has three pieces in the permanent collection. Beyond that, the artist has work in forty-three additional museum permanent collections.

Critical response

Selected solo exhibitions 

 2020: "Agnes Denes: Photos of the Mind, 1969–2002,"  Leslie Tonkonow Artworks + Projects, ADAA Member Viewing Rooms
 2019: "Agnes Denes: Absolutes and Intermediates," The Shed, New York
 2018: "Agnes Denes: Works 1969 - 2018," acb Gallery, Budapest, Hungary
 2017: "Agnes Denes: Truth Approximations," Leslie Tonkonow Artworks + Projects, New York
 2015: "In the Realm of Pyramids: The Visual Philosophy of Agnes Denes," Leslie Tonkonow Artworks + Projects, New York
 2013: "Agnes Denes: Work: 1967 – 2013," Firstite, Essex, United Kingdom (catalog)
 2012: "Agnes Denes: Body Prints, Philosophical Drawings, and Map Projections 1969-1978," Santa Monica Museum of Art, CA (catalog)

"Agnes Denes, Sculptures of the Mind: 1968 to Now," Leslie Tonkonow Gallery, New York

 2010: "Agnes Denes: Body Prints and Other Early Prints on Paper", Leslie Tonkonow Gallery, New York
 2009: "Philosophy in the Land II", Leslie Tonkonow Gallery, New York
 2008: "Agnes Denes: Art for the Third Millennium-Creating a New World View", Ludwig Museum, Budapest, Hungary
 2007: "Uprooted & Deified – The Golden Tree", BravinLee Programs, New York
 2005: "Agnes Denes: Projects for Public Places-A Retrospective", Ewing Gallery, University of Tennessee, Knoxville, Tenn.
 2004: "Agnes Denes: Projects for Public Places-A Retrospective", Chelsea Museum, New York
 2003: "Agnes Denes: Projects for Public Places-A Retrospective", organized by Samek Gallery, Bucknell University, Lewisburg, Pa. (catalog).

Travel: Herron Gallery, Herron School of Art, Indiana University, Indianapolis;

Haggerty Museum of Art, Marquette University, Milkwaukee, Wisc.;

Naples Museum of Art, Naples, Florida.

 1998: "Agnes Denes-Fragmentation", Gallerie Il Bulino, Rome, Italy
 1997: "Anima/Persona-From the Rice/Tree/Burial Project", Joyce Goldstein Gallery, New York

"The Pyramid Suite and Project Drawings", View Gallery, New York

 1996: "The Visionary Art of Agnes Denes", Gibson Gallery, SUNY at Potsdam, New York
 1995: "Philosophy in the Land", Joyce Goldstein Gallery, New York
 1994: "Drawings of Agnes Denes l969-l994", Wynn Kramarsky, New York
 1992: "Agnes Denes: A Retrospective", Herbert F. Johnson Museum of Art, Cornell University, Ithaca, N.Y. (book and travel)
 1990: "Agnes Denes - Concept into Form, Works 1970-1990", Arts Club of Chicago, Ill. (catalog)

"Agnes Denes - El Concepto Hecho Forma, Obras, 1970-1990", Anselmo Alvarez Galeria de Arte, Madrid, Spain (catalog)

 1986: Ricardo Barreto Arte Contemporaneo, Guadalajara, Mexico
 1985: University of Hawaii Art Gallery, Honolulu, Hawaii

Northern Illinois University Art Gallery, Chicago, Ill.

 1982: "Meister der Zeichnung" (Master of Drawing) Invitational, Kunsthalle, Nürnberg, W. Germany (catalog)
 1981: "Print Retrospective", Elise Meyer, Inc., New York
 1980: "Agnes Denes 1968-1980", Hayden Gallery, Massachusetts Institute of Technology, Cambridge, Mass. (catalog)

"Anima/Persona - The Seed", Elise Meyer, Inc., New York

"Agnes Denes", Galleriet, Lund, Sweden

Galerie Aronowitsch, Stockholm, Sweden

 1979: "Agnes Denes Work: 1968-1978", Institute of Contemporary Art, London, England

Studio d'Arte Cannaviello, Milan, Italy

 1978: "Agnes Denes - Philosophical Drawings", Amerika Haus, W. Berlin, W. Germany (catalog)

"Agnes Denes: Work 1968-78", Ikon Gallery, Birmingham, England (catalog)

"Sculptures of the Mind," Centre Culturel Americain, Paris, France

 1977: Tyler School of Art, Temple University, Philadelphia, Penn.

"Animi Pathema - The Emotional Animal", 112 Greene Street Gallery, New York

 1976: "Agnes Denes", Douglass College, Rutgers University, New Brunswick, N. J.

"Agnes Denes", Newport Harbor Art Museum, Newport Beach, Calif.

"Sculptures of the Mind", University of Akron, Ohio (catalog)

 1975: Stefanotty Gallery, New York
 1974: "Agnes Denes: Perspectives", Corcoran Gallery of Art, Washington, D.C. (catalog)

Ohio State University, Columbus, Ohio

 1972: A.I.R. Gallery, New York
 1968: Ruth White Gallery, New York
 1967: New Masters Gallery, New York
 1965: Lewisohn Hall, Columbia University, New York

Awards
 Four fellowships from the National Endowment for the Arts
 Four grants from the New York State Council on the Arts
 CAPS grant (1972)
 National Endowment Fellowships (1974 and 1975)
 The DAAD Fellowship, Berlin (1978)
 American Academy of Arts and Letters Purchase Award (1985)
 Eugene McDermott Award in the Arts at MIT (1990)
 Rome Prize from the American Academy in Rome (1998)
 Jill Watson Award for Transdisciplinary Achievement in the Arts from Carnegie Mellon University (1999)
 Anonymous Was a Woman Award (2007)
 Ambassador's Award for Cultural Diplomacy (2008) from the American Embassy in Hungary
 Art Innovation Impact Award, The Phillips Collection, Washington, DC.(2020)

References

External links
 
  Interview of Denes, images of Wheatfield
 
 Agnes Denes: Sculptures of the Mind: 1968 to Now, Exhibition Site at Leslie Tonkonow Gallery Nov 15, 2012 - Jan 19, 2013
Agnes Denes: Absolutes and Intermediates retrospective exhibition at The Shed, October 9, 2019 - March 22, 2020

Land artists
Columbia University School of the Arts alumni
American conceptual artists
Women conceptual artists
Living people
1931 births
Hungarian emigrants to the United States
The New School alumni
20th-century American women artists
21st-century American women artists